Roza Vidyadhar Deshpande (1929 – 19 September 2020) was an Indian politician of the United Communist Party of India. She was associated with All India Communist Party during 1980 to 1987 and with Communist Party of India earlier, with her husband,  Bani Deshpande.

She was a member of the 5th Lok Sabha from Bombay Central constituency as a CPI candidate.

Deshpande took part in the Samyukta Maharashtra movement (the movement for the creation of the state of Maharashtra) and the Goa liberation struggle as a member of the All India Students Federation.

She was the daughter of Shripad Amrit Dange, a founding member of the Communist Party of India (CPI) and a stalwart of the Indian trade union movement. She wrote the first biography on her father.

References

1929 births
India MPs 1971–1977
Politicians from Mumbai
Lok Sabha members from Maharashtra
2020 deaths
Communist Party of India politicians from Maharashtra